The Eastern Venezuela Basin is major sedimentary basin in northeastern Venezuela that contains copious petroleum reserves. The basin lies between several geological structures. To the south it bounds Guiana Shield, to the north metamorphic rocks of the easternmost Andes, to the west the Espino Graben, to the northeast the Barbados accretionary complex and to the east it bounds to the oceanic crust of the Atlantic Ocean.

References

Further reading 
 
 
 

 
Geology of Trinidad and Tobago
Geology of Venezuela
Geography of Monagas
Geography of Delta Amacuro
Sedimentary basins of Venezuela